LMS diesel shunter 7051 was built by the Hunslet Engine Company to demonstrate its wares. After public exhibition in February 1932, it was used for trials at a colliery, before being tested by the LMS. After further public exhibition in February 1933, it was at last purchased by the LMS in May 1933. It was loaned to the War Department from August 1940, which numbered it 27. During 1941–1944 it was returned to the LMS, but in August 1944 it returned to the WD, now numbered 70027. After the end of World War II it was returned to the LMS, but was withdrawn in December 1945 and resold back to Hunslet. Hunslet used the locomotive as a works shunter, but it was also available for hire, and spent time at oil refineries in Essex and with British Railways.

In September 1960 the locomotive was preserved by the Middleton Railway in Leeds and named John Alcock, named after the then current Managing Director of Hunslet Railway Company. It remains at the Middleton Railway, but has spent time on loan to other locations, including the National Railway Museum, York.

See also
 LMS diesel shunters

References

Literature

7051
Diesel 7051
War Department locomotives
C locomotives
Hunslet locomotives
Railway locomotives introduced in 1932
Standard gauge locomotives of Great Britain